This is a list of surviving ancient Roman gold glass portraits of the finer painted sort.  The majority of surviving Roman gold glass pieces are the cut-off bottoms of drinking glasses made with unpainted gold leaf. These sometimes bear the names of individuals and were probably commemorative gifts on a special occasion such as a wedding anniversary or winning a contest.  Achieving a good likeness was probably not an aim, and certainly not an achievement of this class of object, and they are not included here. The objects here belong to a smaller class of finely painted portrait miniatures, although a few seem also to have been originally placed in cups. Following a table summarizing the basic information, individual portraits are discussed in separate sections.

Corpus

Brescia medallion

The portrait medallion is a part of the ornamentation of the so-called Desiderius Cross, 9th-century processional crux gemmata currently preserved in Museo di Santa Giulia, Brescia, Italy.

The medallion is often referred to as a portrait of Galla Placidia and her children, but the scholarly consensus is strongly against this 18th-century identification.

Some 19th-century scholars, including Raffaele Garrucci and Hermann Vopel, suspected the work to be a fake. The earliest mention of the medallion comes from a 17th-century inventory. In 1762, Francesco Antonio Zaccaria recalled that he saw it circa 1725.

Several details indicate the Egyptian, perhaps Alexandrian origin of the medallion. Stylistically, the painting is closely related to the 3rd-century mummy portraits found in the Faiyum Oasis. The costumes are more consistent with the contemporary fashions in Egypt than in Rome itself. In particular, the mantle worn by the middle figure is not fastened by a fibula, but instead knotted; one parallel for this is a 3rd-century Coptic tapestry medallion, now in the Hermitage Museum, showing the goddess Gaea with her mantle knotted in a similar way. The peculiar hair style of the older woman is unknown in Roman portraiture, but can be found on some 3rd-century plaster mummy masks from Egypt.

Daniel T. Howells (2015) summarizes the research into the Brescia medallion demonstrating its connection to contemporaneous Roman-Egyptian art (in particular the Fayum mummy portraits) as well as linguistic evidence proving the authenticity of the artefact versus the now dubious claim about it being a forgery. Jás Elsner (2007) also contends that the Brescia medallion likely depicts a family from Alexandria, since the inscription is in the Alexandrian dialect of Greek, and provides possible dates ranging from the early-3rd to mid-5th century AD, before it found its way to Italy where it adorned a 7th-century cross.

Ficoroni medallion

Fakes
Gold-glass forgeries are known to have been forged all through the 18th and 19th centuries. In 1759, French antiquarian Anne Claude de Caylus wrote that contemporary Roman dealers were selling gold-glass reproductions to tourists who thought them original. Metropolitan Museum of Art has what are thought to be two 18th-century fake group portraits, while the British Museum has two 19th-century ones.

See also
 Gold glass
 Roman portraiture
 Fayum mummy portraits

Notes

References
 
  google books preview
 Pericle Ducati (1929). I vetri dorati romani nel Museo Civico di Bologna.
 Elsner, Jás (2007). "The Changing Nature of Roman Art and the Art Historical Problem of Style," in Eva R. Hoffman (ed), Late Antique and Medieval Art of the Medieval World, 11–18. Oxford, Malden & Carlton: Blackwell Publishing. .
 
  Internet Archive preview
 Howells, Daniel Thomas (2010). Late Antique Gold Glass in the British Museum, PhD Thesis.
 Howells, Daniel Thomas (2015). "A Catalogue of the Late Antique Gold Glass in the British Museum (PDF)." London: the British Museum (Arts and Humanities Research Council). Accessed 2 October 2016.
  google books preview
 
 Metropolitan Museum of Art (1982). The Vatican Collections: The Papacy and Art. .

External links
 

Lists of works of art
Ancient Roman glassware
Ancient Roman art
Glass works of art
Miniature painting